Tayfun is a Turkish name and may refer to:

 Tayfun Bademsoy (born 1958), Turkish-German actor
 Tayfun Cora (born 1983), Turkish footballer
 Tayfun Korkut (born 1974), Turkish footballer
 Tayfun Pektürk (born 1988), German footballer
 Tayfun Rıdvan Albayrak (born 1980), Turkish footballer
 Tayfun Seven (born 1980), Turkish footballer
 Tayfun Taşdemir (born 1975), Turkish professional carom billiards player
 Tayfun Türkmen (born 1978), Turkish footballer
 Tayfun Uzbay (born 1959), Turkish scientist

Turkish masculine given names